Bayasgalangiin Garidmagnai (born 17 September 1985 in Ulaanbaatar) is a retired Mongolian footballer and current manager.

International career
Garidmagnai made his senior international debut on 22 February 2003 in a 2003 East Asian Football Championship match again Macau. He went on to make thirty-five appearances for the team, scoring two goals, before retiring in 2019.

International goals
Scores and results list Mongolia's goal tally first.

Managerial career
As of December 2021, Garidmagnai is a coach and assistant Coach Education Director of the Mongolian Football Federation. He was a player-coach for BCH Lions in 2020 as the team won the Mongolian First League title. Later that year he joined Athletic 220 FC. He was named the men's team Manager of the Year by the MFF over both of the following two seasons. In July 2022 he was unveiled as the new head coach of Khovd FC of the Mongolian Premier League.

In February 2023 it was announced that Garidmagnai would travel to Qatar to begin his AFC A-badge as part of a partnership between the Mongolian Football Federation and the Qatar Football Association.

Honours 
Individual
MFF Manager of the Season: 2020, 2021

References

External links
 Profile in footballdatabase

1985 births
Living people
Sportspeople from Ulaanbaatar
Mongolian footballers
Erchim players
Erbil SC players
Dalian Shide F.C. players
Association football fullbacks
Association football midfielders
Mongolia international footballers
Mongolian National Premier League players